The Vanguard School (TVS) is a public charter school in Colorado Springs, Colorado, United States. Founded as the Cheyenne Mountain Charter Academy (CMCA) in 1995, it is chartered with the Harrison School District 2. Originally founded as a K–6 charter school, the school expanded to a K–12 school by 2006, and it graduated its first class of seniors in 2010.

History
The Vanguard School was founded in the fall of 1995 as the Cheyenne Mountain Charter Academy. The school was originally created as a K–6 school chartered with the Cheyenne Mountain School District 12. The high school program was approved in 2006.

In 2021, the school's charter changed to the Harrison School District 2.

Disability discrimination lawsuit
In 2014, the school denied an autistic six-year-old student re-enrollment because of its inability to hire staff to care for the student during the day. The mother of the student sued the school district in response, citing the Individuals with Disabilities in Education Act and claiming that not allowing her student re-enrollment would cause him "irreparable harm."  The family was able to keep their son enrolled in the school, but they sued the school district again in 2019 because the school did not provide the student with appropriate accommodations. They ultimately lost the case.

Academics

Enrollment
Students at the Vanguard School are enrolled by a lottery system. Incoming students for the first through eleventh grades require a placement test. In the lottery, students are ranked by priority group, with the children of staff having the highest priority, followed by students in District 2, followed by other students. The school does not accept new twelfth grade students.

Curriculum
The Vanguard School follows the E. D. Hirsh Core Knowledge curriculum. The schools offers its students thirteen Advanced Placement courses, and about four-fifths of high school students participate

Extracurriculars

Athletics
The Vanguard School competes at the 3A level in the Tri-Peaks League of the Colorado High School Activities Association. The school offers eleven sports for high school students, including volleyball, soccer, tennis, cross country, basketball, cheer-leading and track and field. The school also operates a boys' club volleyball team, created in 2013, eight years before CHSAA will officially introduce the sport. This team has won the Colorado 3A championship for three years, from 2016 to 2018.

Team America Rocketry Challenge
The Vanguard School has participated in Team America Rocketry Challenge since 2002. The team made it to the national final competition several times in its history, in 2006, 2008, 2014, 2016, 2018 and 2019, with its best performance being its fifth-place in the 2008 contest.

Campuses
The Vanguard School operates two campuses near downtown Colorado Springs.

Wahsatch campus
The Wahsatch campus is located at 1832 South Wahsatch Avenue. It is the location of the building that serves grades K–3 and is the campus where the school originally operated at.

Corona campus
The Corona campus is located at 1605 South Corona Avenue. It is the campus where grades 4–12 are held. The campus has four buildings that are used for classes, as well as a separate building for a gymnasium, weight room and storage rooms. There is also a collection of buildings that consists of a weight room and some extra classrooms and storage rooms.

The school's campus is in the middle of a neighborhood known for crime. The Executive Director has raised concerns with City Council, and there are occasional incidents. In 2018, a woman was arrested for carrying knives and samurai swords onto the campus.

Notable people

Staff
Bob Gardner, politician
Keith King, politician
Peggy Littleton, politician

References

External links

Public high schools in Colorado
Charter schools in Colorado
High schools in Colorado Springs, Colorado
Educational institutions established in 1995
1995 establishments in Colorado